The Family Planning Association of Hong Kong (FPAHK) is a voluntary organisation that promotes family planning in Hong Kong. The current Executive Director is Dr Lam Wai-cheung, Mona.

History
The Association was founded in 1936 as the Hong Kong Eugenics League (香港優生學會). In 1950, it changed its name officially to The Family Planning Association of Hong Kong. It became one of the founding members of the International Planned Parenthood Federation in 1952.

In 1956, it set up the first subfertility clinic. In 1955, the Hong Kong government began subsidising FPAHK's activities. From 1964 on, FPAHK received financial support by the International Planned Parenthood Federation. In 1967, FPAHK ran the first Hong Kong Family Planning Knowledge, Attitude & Practice (KAP) Survey (「香港家庭計劃知識、態度及實行調查」) and started sex education.

Soon after, the Hong Kong Department of Health started to take over the FPAHK sub-fertility clinics. At the same time, FPAHK started its "Two is enough" (「兩個夠哂數」) campaign. To further publicise its campaign, FPAHK made a poster of artist Petrina Fung playing with her kids, with the caption "No need for lots of babies, have two at most".

In 1986, FPAHK began to establish the first health centre for teenagers at Causeway Bay. In 1989, FPAHK's new headquarters at Wan Chai Southorn Centre began operations. After that, FPAHK pushed through a new artificial insemination service, the family planning awareness initiative, a one-stop service for premarital couples, an obstetric examination service, the experimental hormone replacement therapy plan, and initiated the Hong Kong Women's Reproductive and Sexual Health Advocacy Group (香港婦女生殖與性健康倡議組織). The "Be a Mr. Able in Family Planning" (「家庭計劃，要做得哥」) campaign was launched to entice men to play an active role in birth control. In 1998, FPAHK began to provide a mobile clinic service. In 1999, the mobile library and menopause clinic service started. On 11 December 2006, the FPAHK's office at Tsuen Wan Centre began operation.

In response to the changes of population trend and family value of Hong Kong society, the association suggested "Family Big or Small, Family Planning is Best for All" to raise public awareness on early family planning. New initiatives were made to meet evolving needs of holistic sexual and reproductive health care, including Well Men Clinic, Cervical Diseases Clinic, Osteoporosis Clinic, Breast Clinic and Sex Therapy. On advocating sexuality education, the association launched a 3-year "Youth Sexuality and Love Campaign" in 2008, and organized the "4th Asian Conference on Sexuality Education" in 2010.

References

External links 
 

Non-profit organisations based in Hong Kong
Organizations established in 1936
International Planned Parenthood Federation affiliates
Wan Chai